The 2011 ITK Open was a professional tennis tournament played on hard courts. It was the first edition of the tournament which was part of the 2011 ITF Women's Circuit. It took place in Istanbul, Turkey between 22 and 28 August 2011.

WTA entrants

Seeds

 1 Rankings are as of August 15, 2011.

Other entrants
The following players received wildcards into the singles main draw:
  Hülya Esen
  Sultan Gönen
  Ons Jabeur
  Melis Sezer

The following players received entry from the qualifying draw:
  Gioia Barbieri
  Despina Papamichail
  Nicole Rottmann
  Elina Svitolina

Champions

Singles

 Victoria Larrière def.  Sarah Gronert, 6–3, 1–6, 7–5

Doubles

 Julie Coin /  Eva Hrdinová def.  Sandra Klemenschits /  Irena Pavlovic, 6–4, 7–5

External links
Official Website
ITF Search 

ITK Open
Hard court tennis tournaments
Tennis tournaments in Turkey
2011 in Turkish tennis